A pie supper is a social gathering where pies are auctioned to raise money, often for a local school or fire department. Pie suppers are predominantly associated with Ozark culture, and provided a major source of funding for many of the region's one-room schools in the late 19th and early 20th centuries.

At a traditional pie supper, women and girls would provide homemade pies to be auctioned, sometimes in boxes decorated with ruffles or bows. Along with the pie itself, the highest bidder won the privilege of sharing the pie with its maker, whose identity was concealed or known only to a handful of people. This added an element of suspense to the bidding, and pie suppers had strong courtship elements, as boys vied to win the pies of the girls they favored.

Pie suppers commonly included a "beauty cake" popularity contest. Several girls would be nominated to receive the cake, and their respective admirers would lobby for votes, which were typically priced at a penny each.

A box supper was a less common variation where the boxes auctioned off contained a chicken dinner, cookies, or a collection of food intended to be a surprise. Ozark box suppers were roughly equivalent to the box socials held in other regions.

See also
 List of dining events

References
 Cantrell, Patty. "Pies and People". watersheds.org. Retrieved on 2009-04-19.
 Gilmore, Robert K. (1990). "Box and Pie Suppers". Ozark Baptizings, Hangings, and other Diversions: Theatrical Folkways of Rural Missouri, 1885-1910. University of Oklahoma Press. pp. 103–110. . Retrieved on 2009-04-19.

External links 
 Photo essay about a 1970s pie supper

Missouri culture
Arkansas culture
Oklahoma culture
Dating
Dining events
Contexts for auctions